Saman is a Persian given name and surname, meaning "calm" and "solace." Notable people with this name include:

Given name
 Saman Aghazamani (born 1990), Iranian football midfielder
 Saman Arbabi (born 1973), Iranian-American journalist
 Saman Faezi (born 1991), Iranian volleyball player
 Saman Ghoddos (born 1993), Swedish football player of Iranian descent
 Saman Sultana Jaffri, Pakistani politician
 Saman Nariman Jahan (born 1991), Iranian football striker 
 Saman Jayantha (born 1974), Sri Lankan cricketer 
 Saman Khuda (8th-century), Persian noble 
 Saman Safa (born 1984), Iranian football player
 Saman Salur (born 1976), Iranian director and screenwriter
 Saman Sorjaturong (born 1969), Thai boxer
 Saman Tahmasebi (born 1985), Azerbaijani wrestler
 Saman Kunan, a Thai policeman who died trying to save some boys and girls during the 2018 Thai cave rescue

Surname
 Moises Saman (born 1974), Spanish-American photographer
 Saliya Saman (born 1985), Sri Lankan cricketer

References

Persian masculine given names
Pakistani feminine given names